Coomalie Creek Airfield was a Royal Australian Air Force (RAAF) airfield built in 1942 in what is now the locality of Coomalie Creek, Northern Territory, Australia during World War II. The airfield fell into disuse after the war ended. Since purchasing the surrounding land in 1977, private owners have restored the runway and rebuilt some wartime buildings to preserve the airfield's history. It was listed on the Northern Territory Heritage Register in 2011, along with a nearby anti-aircraft battery that was used for airfield defence.

History
The airfield was operated by No. 54 Operational Base Unit. The first unit to arrive was No. 31 Squadron, equipped with Bristol Beaufighters, in November 1942.

No. 1 Photo Reconnaissance Unit RAAF (1 PRU) arrived at the airfield in 1943 equipped with P-38 Lightnings, de Havilland Mosquitos and CAC Wirraways. 1PRU was re-designated No. 87 Squadron RAAF on 10 September 1944.

In November 1944, three Dakotas from No. 34 Squadron were detached to the airfield, prior to staging north of Australia.

No. 87 Squadron launched the last Australia-based operational RAAF mission of World War II from Coomalie Creek. The airfield was abandoned after World War II and is now in private ownership.

Part of Leg 9 of The Amazing Race 9 was conducted at Coomalie Creek Airfield.

Japanese air raids at Coomalie Creek Airfield

 23 November 1942
 27 November 1942
 2 March 1943
 13 August 1943
 21 August 1943
 10 November 1943

See also
List of airports in the Northern Territory

References

RAAF News Top Stories Volume 48, No. 19, 19 October 2006
OzatWar Website

External links

Former Royal Australian Air Force bases
Defunct airports in the Northern Territory
World War II airfields in Australia
Airports established in 1942
1942 establishments in Australia